A table showing the results of popular elections for U.S. senators from Delaware, beginning in 1916 when the Seventeenth Amendment to the U.S. Constitution, providing for the popular election of for U.S. senators went into effect. Before 1914, they were elected by the Delaware General Assembly.

Elections are held the first Tuesday after November 1. United States senators are popularly elected for a six-year term beginning January 3. Before 1935 terms began March 4.

Class 1 senators

Class 2 senators

Notes

References

External links 
 Our Campaigns- Senate Class 1 
 Our Campaigns- Senate Class 2 

Delaware